Markle Banking & Trust Company Building, also known as the Markle Bank Building, Northeastern Building and currently Hayden Tower is a historic bank building located at Hazleton, Luzerne County, Pennsylvania.  

It was built in 1910, and renovated in 1923 and 1928. It is an 11-story commercial building, 3 bays wide and 7 bays deep, with a 6-story addition in the Classical Revival style.  It is constructed of reinforced concrete with limestone facing.

It was added to the National Register of Historic Places in 1996.

References

Bank buildings on the National Register of Historic Places in Pennsylvania
Neoclassical architecture in Pennsylvania
Commercial buildings completed in 1910
Buildings and structures in Luzerne County, Pennsylvania
Hazleton, Pennsylvania
National Register of Historic Places in Luzerne County, Pennsylvania